Burgan Sports Club is a professional sports club best known for its football team. Based in Al Farwaniyah, the club competes in the Kuwaiti Division One.

History

2014–15 inaugural season

Burgan SC is set to compete in pre-season matches and tournaments inside Kuwait due to it just being added to the football league and would play a number of teams for Kuwait to get ready for the league. It won two unofficial silverware during Ramadan of 2014.

Their first match ended in a 5–0 loss to Al-Naser SC in their reserve league match. Their first league goal came against Al-Arabi SC in a 4–1 loss scored by Marzouq Zaki.

Their first historical victory was against Al-Jahra SC on September 7, 2014 which ended 3–2; Mohammed Kouli scored and Marzouq Zaki scored twice. Their first draw was against Kuwait SC on September 21, 2014.

After seven weeks in the reserve league, Burgan played 7 games where they lost 3, drew 1 and won 2.

As they drew with Kazma SC on November 22, 2014, they were 3rd in the league with 21 points and recorded 3 losses, 3 draws and 6 wins. After January 3, Burgan dropped to 4th, 3 points behind Qadsia SC with a game in hand.

On January 25, 2015, Burgan signed their first official loan deal with Goalkeeper Yousef Al-Saraff from Al-Arabi SC with a buy out option in the summer. Rashid Abdullah Al-Bous said to the press that the team would have to re-evolve to the team at the start of the season and get back to winning form.

After finishing the league, Burgan participated in the Kuwait Federation Cup, and the 14 teams  were drawn into 2 groups, and Burgan's group included  Qadsia SC, Al-Yarmouk, Khaitan SC, Al Salibikhaet SC, Al-Naser SC and Al-Shabab.

Their first official cup match was against Al Salibikhaet SC which ended in a 2–1 loss, and their first official win was on May 1, 2015, against Al-Shabab 2–0. They ended their season finishing 4th in their group in the Kuwait Federation Cup.

2015–2017
It was decided by the management and announced on May 7, 2015, that Burgan's first pre-season tour would take place in Italy.

Burgan exited Kuwait Federation Cup with 2 wins and 4 losses on 18 September 2015. On 27 October 2015 the club management had problems with making a profit off the season's budget of the club; 40% of the management disagreed with it which cause major problems and affected the club's current form on the Federation Cup that season.

On 29 October the club played their first match in Kuwait Emir Cup vs Al-Tadamun SC, The match ended with their first win in the cup and the goal was scored by Tarik Lugman. On November 15 Fayez Frieh became the new Burganian manager.

On April 25, 2016 it was stated that the League division one would return for 2017-2018 due to Kuwait Football Association being banned by fifa thus not allowing the tournament to be returned until reinstated by FIFA.

On September 6, 2016 it was announced burgan would return to play in an official tournaments starting 2016-17 alongside new manager Hamad Al Harbi.

On September 28, 2016 the club played their first historical match in the Kuwaiti Premier League against Al-Nasr SC, which they lost 2-0. The following week they scored their first goal in the league in a 1-5 loss to Al-Shabab. The following week on 14 October the club got their first win against Al-Fahaheel FC 1-0.

After finishing 15th place in 2016-17 premier league the club got relegated to the lower division.

2017–
As the 2017–18 Kuwaiti Division One ended, Burgan's first season ended in the league at 4th place who were one of the contenders to win it.

Development

Before Burgan SC was registered, it had entered many friendly matches and competitions, several against KOC FC and against universities ranging from AUK to Kuwait University. 

Their final match as an unregistered team was against the Kuwait Military Gov. FC and they lost 3–2,.

Burgan have started to scout and build up age group teams from under-9, 12, 14, 16, 18 and under-21.

Honours

Friendly

Faraz Cup:1
2014

Shamlan Cup:1
2014

Crest and colors

Crest evolution

Burgan SC's crest is represented as a shield of honor of Kuwait and sports, with the Kuwait map and flag and a football representing all kinds of sports.

The first idea for the logo was the same shield but without an English name on it, but they decided to add this, due to it being a new team.

Their first logo was introduced in 2007 and was replaced in 2014 after being officiated by the KFA to compete in Kuwait football. The 2014 logo has a larger sized body with a lighter color added to it with the 2007 date added to the logo.

On March 19, 2016 the club announced their new logo. They became the first Kuwaiti team to have a circular Logo.

Club colors
The club colors are light yellow and light blue, although the light yellow was previously darker.

Club kits

Home

Away and alternates

Burgan managerial history

Derbies and classicos

Burgan vs Khaitan SC
Their first derby match happened in pre-season 2014, when Burgan beat Khaitan 1–0, and then beat them again in the league (1–0 and 2–0).
The season after Burgan defeated them in the Federation Cup 8–1.

References

External links
Burgan SC Twitter page 

 
Football clubs in Kuwait
2007 establishments in Kuwait
Association football clubs established in 2007
Articles which contain graphical timelines
Sports teams in Kuwait